Aristaea atrata is a moth of the family Gracillariidae. It is known from Madagascar.

The larvae feed on Rubiaceae species. They probably mine the leaves of their host plant.

References

Aristaea
Moths of Madagascar
Moths of Africa
Moths described in 1985